Rescale is a software technology company that claims to provide "Intelligent Computing for Digital R&D", with a focus on high-performance computing, cloud management, and computer aided engineering.

Overview 
Rescale helps organizations across industries accelerate science and engineering breakthroughs by eliminating computing complexity. Rescale to offers high-performance computing as-a-service to organizations through automation on a hybrid cloud control plane with security, architecture, and financial controls. Design Engineering magazine describes Rescale as "...a good fit for manufacturers who need to run complex simulation and optimization jobs, but don't have the HPC hardware required."

As of 2015, Rescale established the largest globally available HPC network which enables hybrid and multi-cloud operations across major cloud service providers and on-premises data centers. Rescale provides IT and HPC practitioners with access to computing architectures targeted to workloads in the aerospace, automotive, pharmaceutical, computational genomics, manufacturing, electronic design automation, and semiconductor industries.

History 
Founded in 2011 in San Francisco, California, by Joris Poort (CEO) and Adam McKenzie (CTO), Rescale launched in Y Combinator and has been recognized as a top company multiple times as recently as 2023. The founders, Poort and McKenzie, previously built a software technology at Boeing saving the company over $180 million through weight improvements on the 787 Dreamliner.

Investors 
Rescale has received investment funding from high-profile investors including Sam Altman, Jeff Bezos, Richard Branson, Chris Dixon, Paul Graham, and Peter Thiel. Notable corporate and venture capital investors include Nvidia, M12 (venture capital) arm of (Microsoft), Hitachi, Samsung, Initialized Capital, and Andreessen Horowitz. By 2022, Rescale had raised over $200 million and reach a valuation of over $1 billion, making it the first unicorn company in cloud high performance computing.

Partnerships 
Rescale has strategic partnerships with major cloud infrastructure providers Amazon Web Services, Microsoft Azure, Google Cloud Platform, and Oracle Cloud Platform and with engineering software companies in the computer aided engineering space including ANSYS, AutoForm, Siemens Digital Industries Software, Dassault Systemes and MSC Software.

See also
 Cloud computing
 Enterprise software
 High performance computing
 Computer aided engineering
 Product lifecycle management
 Software-defined infrastructure
 Digital Twin
 Multidisciplinary design optimization

References

External links
 Rescale's website
 Rescale is a part of the Big Compute consortium

Business software